Dzhigda, also known as Jigda (Russian: Джигда) is a village in the center of Khabarovsk Krai, Russia along the Maya river. The village is connected by a small road and contains 79 buildings within its jurisdictional area. Dzhigda's total population, of mainly Russians and Evenks, as of 2022, is 230, after having steadily decreased from 1992's census of 432.

References 

Rural localities in Khabarovsk Krai